Sergei Nikolaevich Dobrotvorsky (January 22, 1959, Leningrad —  August 27, 1997, St. Petersburg) was a Soviet and Russian actor, director and screenwriter, film critic,   journalist. Member of the Union of Cinematographers of the Russian Federation. Member of the expert commission of the State Film Agency of Russia. Member of FIPRESCI. Author of more than six hundred publications on the history and theory of cinema, reviews, reviews, etc., published in Russia, the CIS countries and abroad.

He died on August 27, 1997 in St. Petersburg from a heroin overdose. Buried at the Smolensky Cemetery.

References

External links 

 Parallel cinema. Lecture by Sergei Dobrotvorsky

1959 births
1997 deaths
Soviet film directors
Russian film directors
Soviet male actors
Male actors from Saint Petersburg
Film theorists
Soviet film critics
Russian film critics
Mass media people from Saint Petersburg
Soviet screenwriters
20th-century Russian screenwriters
Male screenwriters
20th-century Russian male writers
Russian State Institute of Performing Arts alumni
Deaths by heroin overdose